Sterling Lanard Palmer (born February 4, 1971) is a former American football defensive end in the National Football League for the Washington Redskins.  He played college football at Florida State University and was drafted in the fourth round of the 1993 NFL Draft.

1971 births
Living people
Players of American football from Fort Lauderdale, Florida
Palmer, Sterling
American football defensive ends
Florida State Seminoles football players
Washington Redskins players